Sanhita Nandi is a prominent Hindustani classical vocalist of the Kirana Gharana. The central motif of her style is slow tempo raga development (voice culture, voice throw, and tonal application) and ornamented sargams. She is getting guidance under Mashkoor Ali Khan.

Early life
Sanhita Nandi was trained under the late A. Kanan of Kirana Gharana, the senior most guru at the ITC Sangeet Research Academy.

Career

Sanhita Nandi has travelled extensively to perform, both within and outside of India. She has been invited to perform at music festivals such as Sawai Gandharva Music Festival, Tansen Samaroh in Gwalior, Saptak Festival of Music in Ahmedabad, Harballabh Sangeet Sammelan in Jalandhar, ITC Sangeet Research Academy in Kolkata, SPIC MACAY, Gururao Deshpande Sangeet Sabha in Bangalore, Laxmi Narayan Sangeet Samaroha in Amritsar, Parampara Dance and Music Festival in Chennai, Samaagamaa Festival in Chennai, KM Music Conservatory in Chennai, Ustad Rahmat Khan Sangeet Sammelan in Dharwad, Samrat Sangeet Sammelan in Goa, Yashwant Rao Chauhan Smriti Sangeet Samaroha in Maharashtra, Glimpses of Kirana Gharana Music Festival in Hyderabad, and Dadar Matunga Cultural Center and Sangit Mahabharti in Mumbai.

She has been also invited to music concerts in the US and Canada, such as Annenberg Center for the Performing Arts in Philadelphia, Philadelphia Museum of Art, Chhandayan All Night concert in New York, Cornell University, Drexel University, Massachusetts Institute of Technology in Boston, and Royal Alberta Museum in Edmonton.

Discography

Serenity - Madhuvanti, Bageshree.

Further reading

Torch-bearers of Kirana gharana, and their followers:
Classical singer casts spell:
One people One Voice:
Sanhita Nandi impresses with precise taans, rhythmic taals:
Cruising along melodic scales:
Versatile Sanhita Nandi:
LearnQuest Presents Top Hindustani Style Musicians:
Prominent exponent of Kirana Gharana:
Tansen Samaroh 2014:

References 

Living people
Hindustani singers
Indian women classical singers
Singers from West Bengal
Kirana gharana
20th-century Indian singers
Women Hindustani musicians
20th-century Indian women singers
21st-century Indian women singers
21st-century Indian singers
Women musicians from West Bengal
Year of birth missing (living people)